Joëlle Bukuru (born 13 February 1999) is a Burundian footballer who plays as a midfielder for Simba Queens and Burundi women's national team.

References

External links 
 Joëlle Bukuru on Simba official profile

1999 births
Living people
Sportspeople from Bujumbura
Burundian women's footballers
Women's association football midfielders
Simba S.C. players
Burundi women's international footballers
Burundian expatriate footballers
Burundian expatriate sportspeople in Tanzania
Expatriate women's footballers in Tanzania